Ala Singh (1691–1765)  was the first king of the princely state of Patiala. He was born in 1691 at Phul, in present-day Bathinda district of the Punjab, in Jat sikh family to Chaudhary Ram Singh of Phulkian Misl. His father had six children, from eldest to youngest Dunna, Subha, Ala, Bakha, Budha, Ludha. The Chowdhriat of the Misl had been originally conferred on his ancestor Brahm by Babur, after the First battle of Panipat in 1526 A.D.

Ahmad Shah Durani attacked Barnala in the absence of the Maharaja, when he was at Moonak. He forced the Maharaja to pay Rs. four lacs, out of which only Rs. fifty thousand were paid. The Durani King conferred upon him the title of "Raja" and granted him an area comprising 727 villages. Ala Singh at the age of 57, in 1763 A.D., laid the foundation of the city of Patiala. In the same year heading the Sikh confederacy he conquered Sirhind and surrounding territories along with Nanu Singh Saini. He died in 1765, leaving the gaddi to his grandson Maharaja Amar Singh, his three sons having predeceased him. Sardaul Singh the eldest died in 1753, Bhumian Singh died in 1742 and Lal Singh the youngest died in 1748.

Gallery

References

Further reading 
 

1691 births
1765 deaths
People from Patiala
Punjabi people